A multiple-conclusion logic is one in which logical consequence is a relation, between two sets of sentences (or propositions).   is typically interpreted as meaning that whenever each element of  is true, some element of  is true; and whenever each element of  is false, some element of  is false.

This form of logic was developed in the 1970s by D. J. Shoesmith and Timothy Smiley but has not been widely adopted.

Some logicians favor a multiple-conclusion consequence relation over the more traditional single-conclusion relation on the grounds that the latter is asymmetric (in the informal, non-mathematical sense) and favors truth over falsity (or assertion over denial).

See also 
 Sequent calculus

References

Logic